James Allen Westby (born March 5, 1937) is an American former ice hockey defenseman and Olympian.

Westby played with Team USA at the 1964 Winter Olympics held in Innsbruck, Austria. He previously played for the Minnesota Golden Gophers of the University of Minnesota.

References

External links

1937 births
Living people
Ice hockey players at the 1964 Winter Olympics
Olympic ice hockey players of the United States
Ice hockey people from Minneapolis
American men's ice hockey defensemen
Minnesota Golden Gophers men's ice hockey players